The Somali shrew (Crocidura somalica) is a species of mammal in the family Soricidae. It is found in Ethiopia, Mali, Somalia, and Sudan. Its natural habitat is dry savanna.

References
 Hutterer, R. 2004.  Crocidura somalica.   2006 IUCN Red List of Threatened Species.   Downloaded on 30 July 2007.

Crocidura
Mammals described in 1895
Taxa named by Oldfield Thomas
Taxonomy articles created by Polbot